Karaksar is an former air base in Russia located 42 km northeast of Olovyannaya. It is a former military airfield with taxiways and tarmac, probably for forward deployment in the event of a Sino-Soviet conflict, demolished at the end of the Cold War.

References
RussianAirFields.com

Soviet Air Force bases
Soviet Frontal Aviation